Martha Heredia Rivas (born February 1, 1991) also known as La Baby (The Baby) is a Dominican singer and winner of the fourth and last season of the singing competition television series Latin American Idol

History
Martha Roseli Heredia Rivas was born in Santiago de los Caballeros, Dominican Republic, on February 4, 1991. She is the daughter of Felipe Heredia and Maritza Rivas. She started singing and writing songs at the age of fifteen and formed her first group called Una Vía singing hip hop, reggaeton and other genres of urban music with her brother Luis Felipe. Heredia later had the opportunity of working in the United States of America where she created and wrote her own songs. Since her rise to fame after Latin American Idol,  has become a successful artist working in the USA and in the Dominican Republic.

Latin American Idol
At 18, Heredia traveled to San José, Costa Rica to audition for the fourth season of Latin American Idol. She did well on her audition and later traveled to Argentina, where she was amongst the top performers of a Latin American Idol workshop. Her next challenge was to earn the most votes out of the 12 performers on the show. For two months, she was very successful and went all the way up to the final between her and Eduardo Aguirre of Costa Rica, where she performed with Franco de Vita. On December 10, 2009, after receiving more than 50% of the total number of votes, Martha Heredia became the new Latin American Idol.

Post Latin American Idol work
Heredia released her first single Música'' in January 2010 and was supposed to record her first studio album with Sony BMG, however, as of 2013 it was not produced and/or released.

References

External links
Latin American's Idol Official website

1991 births
21st-century Dominican Republic women singers
Living people